Freiburger FC is a German association football club based in Freiburg, Baden-Württemberg. Freiburger FC were one of the founding clubs of the DFB (German Football Association) in 1900.

History
Founded in 1897, for many decades FFC were the dominant club in the city. Their early successes included a South German title in their second season and a national championship in 1907. The club were also semi-finalists of the Torneo Internazionale Stampa Sportiva, one of the first international football competitions in the world, in 1908. Those wins proved to be the height of their success, and they have not won any significant honours since. In 1916, the club managed to win the Südkreis-Liga but the competition was heavily affected by the war and very localised.

The club belonged to the tier-one Kreisliga Südwest and then the Bezirksliga Baden throughout its existence from 1923 to 1933. They played mid-table in the Gauliga Baden through the 1930s, and after the Second World War, entered the 2. Oberliga Süd.

With the formation of the Bundesliga, Germany's professional football league, in 1963, Freiburg found themselves seeded in the tier II Regionalliga Süd, while SC Freiburg were playing in the Amateurliga Südbaden (III). FFC slipped to that level for three seasons in 1974–77 before playing their way back to 2. Bundesliga. However the team could not draw support and suffered from poor attendance throughout the following five-year period spent in the 2nd division. When they were relegated to the amateur Oberliga Baden-Württemberg in 1982, only a saving campaign by fans kept the club out of bankruptcy, while SC Freiburg remained in the 2. Bundesliga on their way to the top flight.

Since 1994, FFC played in the Verbandsliga Südbaden, interrupted by the 1999–2000 season, when the club dropped to the Landesliga for a year. In 2009, the club's decline continued with a more permanent drop to the Landesliga. After finishing third in its first two attempts at promotion the club came second in the Landesliga in 2011–12 and qualified for the promotion round to the Verbandsliga. After a 2–2 draw at FC Radolfzell the club achieved promotion by defeating SC Offenburg 5–1.

Continued financial problems forced Freiburger FC to sell its Möslestadion and enter into a sharing arrangement with Blau-Weiß Wiehre. Their former stadium was taken up by SC Freiburg as a youth facility.

After a twenty-year absence, Freiburger FC returned to the Oberliga Baden-Württemberg after winning the Verbandsliga title in 2014 but were relegated again in 2016 season after just two seasons at this level. In the 2018–19 season the club finished second in the Verbandsliga Südbaden and were again promoted to the Oberliga Baden-Württemberg.

Venues
Freiburger FC has played home matches on the sports ground on Schwarzwaldstrasse on the eastern edge of the Freiburg city since 1898. The first international football match in a Freiburg venue took place on this stadium, which could hold up to 6,000 spectators. The Germany national team played an international friendly match against Switzerland on 18 May 1913 and Germany lost by 1–2 in front of 10,000 spectators. In 1922 the FFC moved to the new Möslestadion. In 2000 the club moved to the Schönberg Stadium, and, since 2008, it has been playing in the Freiburg Stadium in Dietenbach.

Honours

League
 German football championship
 Champions: 1907
 Southern German championship
 Champions: 1898, 1907
 Südkreis-Liga (I)
 Champions: 1916
 Kreisliga Südwest (I)
 Champions: 1920
 Bezirksliga Baden (I)
 Champions: 1930
 2. Oberliga Süd (II)
 Champions: 1956
 Oberliga Baden-Württemberg (III)
 Champions: 1984
 Verbandsliga Südbaden (IV-VI)
 Champions: 1991, 2014
 Amateurliga Südbaden (III)
 Champions: 1977

Cup
 South Baden Cup (Tiers 3–5)
 Winners: 1951, 1991, 1992

Recent managers
Recent managers of the club:

Recent seasons
The recent season-by-season performance of the club:

 With the introduction of the Regionalligas in 1994 and the 3. Liga in 2008 as the new third tier, below the 2. Bundesliga, all leagues below dropped one tier.

Partner clubs
The club has strong connections to English football club Guildford City F.C., with Guildford being a sister city of Freiburg, and publishes news and results of the later club on its website.

References

External links
 Official website
 Abseits Guide to German Soccer
 Freiburger FC profile at Weltfussball.de
 Das deutsche Fußball-Archiv historical German domestic league tables 

 
Football clubs in Germany
Football clubs in Baden-Württemberg
Association football clubs established in 1897
1897 establishments in Germany
Sport in Freiburg im Breisgau
2. Bundesliga clubs